The 2018 CollegeInsider.com Postseason Tournament (CIT) was a postseason single-elimination tournament of  NCAA Division I basketball teams. The tournament began on March 12, 2018, and concluded on March 30, 2018.

The field was composed of participants who belong to "mid-major" conferences and who were not invited to the NCAA tournament, the National Invitation Tournament, or the College Basketball Invitational.

Participating teams
The following teams received an invitation to the 2018 CIT:

Format
The CIT uses the old NIT model in which there is no set bracket. Future round opponents are determined by the results of the previous round.

Postseason classics
In 2016, the CIT introduced the Coach John McLendon Classic as the first "Classic" game to ever be played during a postseason tournament. For 2017, the CIT introduced three more "Classic" games, for a total of four, all to be played in the first round. In 2018, a fifth "Classic" was added.

Coach John McLendon Classic
Hugh Durham Classic
Lou Henson Classic
Riley Wallace Classic
Jim Phelan Classic

The winners of each Classic received a trophy and advanced to the second round or to the quarterfinals if they received a second round bye.

Schedule
 Wofford, Northern Colorado, Portland State, and Sam Houston State received first round byes.  
 Liberty, UTSA, Austin Peay, and UIC received second round byes.

Bracket
Bracket is for visual purposes only. The CIT does not use a set bracket.

Home teams listed second.
* Denotes overtime period.

References

External links
CollegeInsider.com Postseason Tournament

CollegeInsider.com
CollegeInsider.com Postseason Tournament